The Emperor Waltz or Emperor Waltz may refer to:
 Kaiser-Walzer, Op. 437 (also known as Emperor Waltz), a waltz composed by Johann Strauss II in 1889.
 The Emperor Waltz, 1948 American musical film directed by Billy Wilder and starring Bing Crosby and Joan Fontaine.
 The Emperor Waltz (1953 film), Austrian drama
 The Emperor's Waltz (1933 film), German film directed by Frederic Zelnik
 Bing Crosby – The Emperor Waltz, 1948 Bing Crosby album of 78 rpm singles by from the film.
 Top o' the Morning / Emperor Waltz,  1950 Bing Crosby LP album by combining the 1948 recordings with others from the 1949 film Top o' the Morning